Blessed Andrew may refer to:

Andrea Gallerani
Andrew of Sandomierz
André Abellon
Andrea da Segni
André de Soveral
Andrew of Phu Yen
André-Abel Alricy
Andé Angar
Andrea Carlo Ferrari
Andrea Giacinto Longhin
Andriy Ishchak
Andrés Solá y Molist